The 1985 Houston Cougars football team represented the University of Houston during the 1985 NCAA Division I-A football season. The Cougars were led by 24th-year head coach Bill Yeoman and played their home games at the Astrodome in Houston, Texas. The team competed as members of the Southwest Conference, finishing in sixth. Houston finished the season with a record of 4–7.

Schedule

Source:

Roster

References

Houston
Houston Cougars football seasons
Houston Cougars football